Zollikofer is a surname. Notable people with the surname include:

Georg Joachim Zollikofer (1730–1788), Swiss-German theologian
Johannes Zollikofer (1633–1692), Swiss Calvinist theologian

Swiss-German surnames